Kotin is a surname. Notable people with the surname include:

 Albert Kotin (1907–1980), American artist
 Josef Kotin (1908–1979), Soviet constructor of tanks
 Nikita Kotin (born 2002), Russian footballer
 Vladimir Kotin (born 1962), Soviet figure skater